Line 17 of the Shenzhen Metro is a line under planning in the eastern Shenzhen districts of Luohu and Longgang.

Stations (Phase 1)

References

Shenzhen Metro lines